Mijailo is a South Slavic masculine given name cognate to Mihailo and Mihajlo.

Notable people with the name include:

 Mijailo Grušanović (born 1962), Serbian basketball player
 Mijailo Mijailović (born 1978), Swedish criminal of Serbian descent

See also
 Mijailović

Serbian masculine given names